Jasper Keith "Jap" Smith, Jr. (June 20, 1905 – May 18, 1992), was an attorney and politician from Louisiana who served in the Louisiana House of Representatives.

References

1905 births
1992 deaths
Louisiana lawyers
Democratic Party members of the Louisiana House of Representatives
Politicians from Shreveport, Louisiana
People from Vivian, Louisiana
Davidson College alumni
Tulane University Law School alumni
American Presbyterians
20th-century American lawyers
20th-century American politicians